Health & Help is an international non-governmental humanitarian aid organization, providing medical care in developing countries.
The organization opened its clinics in Central American countries with poorly developed infrastructure and low-income population, with little or medical care in most of the regions. 
The project was founded in 2015 by Viktoria Valikova, MD, an infectious disease specialist from Ufa, Russia, who has been working in Central America since 2014, and Karina Basharova, the CEO of the project. The first clinic opened its doors in early 2017[1][2]. 
There are two Health & Help medical facilities in Central America, located in rural parts of Guatemala and Nicaragua.
Health & Help staff includes multinational volunteer physicians and other medical professionals as well as photographers, coordinators, assistants, construction workers and home-based specialists[3].

History 

In 2014, the founder Victoria Valikova graduated from the Institute of Tropical Medicine Antwerp, Belgium, majoring in "Tropical medicine and health systems management in resource-constrained settings". 
Victoria chose to volunteer her skills in Guatemala as she was overwhelmed with poverty rates and low health care levels in the country. She was shocked there were no clinics or health centers in rural areas with underdeveloped transportation systems, leaving local people no chance to receive medical attention when needed. 
Alternative medicine is widely spread around the country: healers and rural midwives are trusted with lives, however, death rates are disturbingly high due to lack of professional training and access to modern medication.
Victoria could not complete her first mission due to a military conflict in the area, nevertheless she moved to Honduras and helped manage cholera outbursts across Haiti. There she came up with an idea to open her own non-profit clinic.
Once she got back home, Victoria started working on the strategy and inviting partners to join. In Ufa, Russia, she met Karina Basharova, who became the driving force of the project. Together, they created a plan, attracted talents through social media, and raised money via crowdfunding platforms boomstarter.ru[4] and generosity.com. The first clinic was opened in a small village in Guatemala.
The mission was supported by Rustem Khamitov, Artemy Lebedev, Cemento Progreso, ECA Guatemala and many others.
Health & Help expanded throughout the first year, introducing new programs and working with new locations. 2019 will bring the world the second clinic in Nicaragua.

Guatemala 

Initially, the clinic construction site was planned to be in the village of Sentinela - with a population of 2,500 people - which is located in one of Guatemala's most mountainous areas, far away from big cities. However, in March 2016, the plans had changed due to a series of armed conflicts for the control over the lands of Sentinela. Therefore, the site was relocated to the village of Jutacaj (with population of 8,000 people) where medical assistance was needed as well, owing to lack of nearby health centers and poor quality of the local roads. However, the construction site was once again moved as the corruption of the local authorities was exceedingly high. Finally, the village of Chuinajtajuyub (Totonikapan area) was chosen, where the clinic opened its doors for 20,000 people.
Architects Mikhail and Elizaveta Shishins, who have previously built a school in Nepal, designed the clinic building. In June 2016, the construction started, and over 35 volunteers from around the world joined the project. Local people were also hired to participate. Meanwhile, doctors were seeing patients in a small room at the local school. Uninterrupted patient care was provided despite the lack of space and shortage of resources. The clinic opened its doors on February 24, 2017.

Currently Health & Help is open 24/7 for emergency care, and 8 hours a day almost daily as a clinic. The medical staff sees around 70 patients a day, introducing preventive care to local communities. 

Medical Volunteers give out pediatric, general and gynaecology consultations, prescribe medication, perform minor surgeries, provide pregnancy check ups, deliver babies, and educate local people on type I diabetes, child malnutrition, planned parenthood, personal hygiene and healthy diet.

During the Fuego Volcano eruption in June 2018, Health & Help volunteers arrived at the site, providing victims with much needed medical attention.

Nicaragua 

The construction of the second clinic launched in Las Salvias, Nicaragua in late 2018.

Architects Mikhail and Elizaveta Shishins designed the clinic building. The region is known for its high malaria rates, therefore this medical facility will have a laboratory to detect this disease.

The clinic is scheduled to be opened in spring 2019.

Fundamental principles 

 Health & Help provides communities with access to healthcare without discrimination regardless of their skin color, gender, national identity, religion or financial status.
 The organization operates on volunteers’ and sponsors’ donations only; no political, religious or governmental bodies provide financial support to Health & Help.
 Health & Help opens clinics in low resource countries, where local communities lack access to basic medical care. 
 Medical and other volunteers support the project pro bono.
 The project actively builds and supports relations between volunteers and neighbourhood indigenous groups, creating jobs for local citizens.

Special Programs in Guatemala

Childhood Malnutrition 
Guatemala has the sixth-highest rate of chronic childhood malnutrition in the world and it is a growing concern. The overall prevalence is over 40%, and in the Totonicapán region where Health & Help practices it reaches a heartbreaking 70%, affecting native populations the most. Together with the Department of Health, the clinic provides children with nutritional supplements, vitamins, antiparasitic medications, and educates parents on the basics of nutrition, hygiene and child care. No child is left behind.

Birth Control 
An average woman in Guatemala  gets married in her mid-to-late teens and has over 6 children in her lifetime. Health & Help empowers local women to take control of their reproductive health, and to teach their daughters to do the same. Our organization believes healthy families start from healthy women, and an extremely hard work to is done to support local women in their reproductive decisions.

Pregnancy Check ups 
Health & Help encourages women to come for pregnancy check ups as soon as they find out they are carrying a child. All women of childbearing age are offered pregnancy testing, as some of them do not know they are carrying a child until many months into pregnancy. Additionally, the mortality rates during child labor are high, at 34 per 1000 births[5].

The clinic invests significant effort into counseling pregnant women, and providing prenatal care and vitamins.

Diabetes 
Health & Help brought a diabetes education program to the area, which is a unique approach for the region. A huge number of people in Guatemala are diagnosed with type I diabetes, which is regretfully the cause of 5% of all deaths in the country. People diagnosed with diabetes receive extensive counseling, learn how to use glucometers to control their blood glucose levels at home, and receive life saving medications. Patients are encouraged to come with their family members to ensure home support and diet modification.

References

External links 
 The rules of the tropical doctor's life (in russian)
 A part of the project presentation in Moscow (in russian)
 Tripsecrets about Health&Help project (in russian)
 The interview for the magazine "I Pelmeshka" (in russian)
 The official cite of Health&Help project
 The blog of the project's founder, Victoria Valikova
 The official page of the Health&Help project on Facebook

Medical and health organizations based in Guatemala
Charities based in Russia
Foreign charities operating in Guatemala